The Battle of Karbala was a battle which was fought during the 1991 uprisings in Iraq which followed the Gulf War. The battle started after demoralized troops throughout Iraq began to rebel against Saddam Hussein. From 5 to 19 March 1991, the city of Karbala became a chaotic battlefield as the result of bitter fighting between the insurgents and the Iraqi Republican Guard. After the failure of the uprising, citizens were killed in large numbers. Parts of the city were nearly leveled.

Prelude
In the years leading up to the Gulf War, the city of Karbala boasted that it had a population of over 150,000 inhabitants. Tourists from Africa all the way to Pakistan flocked to the city in order to go on pilgrimages to the Imam Husayn Shrine. In the months of the Gulf War, the city was carefully avoided by the Coalition during its bombing campaign due to the significance of its mosques. The city suffered little damage throughout the war in general.

In the days leading up to the uprising, some believed that agents from Iran moved in amongst the population for the future purpose of channeling an Islamic revolution; an unsubstantiated claim which the Ba'athist regime was all too eager to propagate as part of its attempt to discredit the uprising. Finally, on 1 March, the uprising began in the southern city of Basra. With this, the tides of revolt spread throughout Iraq, from the southern marshes to the Kurdish mountains.

Uprising

5 March
Some of the opposition groups had already distributed pamphlets throughout the local population, feeding anti-Saddam sentiment to the people. It was also reported that a number of these opposition groups consisted of former regular Iraqi Army soldiers who had served in Kuwait during the Persian Gulf War. Earlier that day, soldiers returning from the front arrived in Karbala.

The revolt began at 2:30 PM when youths began riding through the streets with weapons, attacking government buildings and loyalist soldiers. This action provoked the population to come out of their homes with light arms and knives, known as "white weapons," to join in the attack. Such weapons became supplemented with heavier weapons captured from Baath Party forces. The Holy Endowments administration building was the first to be sacked, followed by several others. The rebels also stormed the al-Husseini hospital and took over their wards. Many of the holy Shia shrines immediately became the main headquarters for the insurgency, the main two being the Shrines of Husayn ibn Ali and Al-Abbas ibn Ali.

Some of the local Baathist officials and top security agents, including the chief of police and the deputy governor, were killed in brutal ways since they did not retreat in time. Many of their bodies were left lying in their streets and often burned. On the loudspeakers from the Shia Shrines, insurgents called for prisoners to be brought to the Shrine of Abbas for execution. By morning, the city was under complete rebel control.

6–11 March
There was great hope that the Saddam's regime would not be able to quell this rebellion without air power. But since issues had been provoked throughout the city, which was blocked by the coalition forces as a condition of Gulf War ceasefire. However, U.S. forces did not prevent Saddam from using overwhelming force to suppress the uprising. Karbala suffered severe artillery shelling and rebel holdouts were attacked with helicopter gunships, despite the official declaration of Iraqi no-fly zones.

Iraqi Republican Guard encountered resistance as soon as they entered the city. As a result of the mostly-Sunni Republican Guard's resentment of the Shiites, it was said that the tanks bore placards saying, "No More Shia After Today." The main targets included the main Shia shrines and the al-Husseini hospital. At the hospital, doctors treated the wounded while people continually rushed in to donate blood and medicine, despite the concentrated shelling from the loyalist forces on the city outskirts. The rebels put up a stiff resistance in defending the hospital. Once it fell, the army rounded up doctors, nurses, and took them away for execution. Patients were thrown out of windows and reports surfaced of bulldozers burying bodies on the hospital grounds.

Throughout the counterattack, voices could be heard on loudspeakers at the shrines of Abbas and Hussein, directing orders for the insurgency to attack the Republican Guard. In the closing days of the uprising, the shrines were heavily damaged by artillery and rocket fire from helicopters. Many rebels and their civilian sympathizers barricaded themselves into the buildings. Video recordings show the people dancing in euphoria and calling for the aid of America and Iran, which never came. Once the loyalist forces surrounded the shrine, the leader of the assault and a henchman of Saddam, Kamal Hussein Majid, stood on a tank and shouted: "Your name is Hussein and so is mine. Let us see who is stronger now." He then gave the order to open fire on the shrine. After blowing down the doors, the Guard rushed in and killed a majority of those inside with automatic weapons fire.

Once in control of the city, the army encircled each district looking for young men. At first they shot whomever they saw. After a day or so, they arrested every male over the age of 15. Shia clerics found walking on the streets were rounded up and never seen again. Dead bodies were mined and they were not allowed to be removed from the streets. Helicopter gunships on the outskirts reportedly strafed civilians fleeing the city as well.

19 March
Soldiers took vengeance on both rebels and civilians who had not fled. Moving from district to district, they rounded up young men suspected of being rebels, transported them to stadiums where some were executed. Others were reportedly sent to a large detention facility outside Baghdad. Such marks indicated that the uprising was officially suppressed.

Aftermath
Reports indicated that no neighborhood was left intact after the uprising. In the vicinity of the shrines of Husayn ibn Ali and Abbas ibn Ali, most of the buildings which surrounded the shrines were completely reduced to rubble. The shrines themselves were scarred by bullet marks and tank fire. They were, however, quickly restored by the Shiite donations.

In December 2005, workers maintaining water pipes 500 meters from the Imam Hussein Shrine unearthed a mass grave containing dozens of bodies, apparently those of Shiites killed after the uprising.

Another mass grave was discovered south of Karbala on 10 January 2010, it contained the bodies of 23 people who were members of both sexes.

Popular culture
The 2014 film The Blue Man, which is related to The New York Times article titled "Uncovering Iraq's Horrors in Desert Graves" written by John F. Burns, is about rebels who were killed during the uprising and buried in The Blue Man mass grave.

See also

1915 uprising in Karbala
Battle of Karbala
1991 uprising in Sulaymaniyah
List of conflicts in the Middle East
Iran–Iraq War
Gulf War
1935–36 Iraqi Shia revolts

References

External links
 The 1991 Uprising in Iraq And Its Aftermath
 Uprising Anniversary
 (Video) "Scenes from the Iraqi Uprising of 1991 in Holy Karbala"
 (Video)  "Karbala: City of Martyrs - Iraq"
 Mass grave from 1991 uprising unearthed in Karbala

Battle of Karbala
Karbala
Karbala, 1991
Collective punishment
Karbala
Karbala
Shia Islam
War crimes in Iraq
Rebellions in Iraq
Iraqi war crimes
March 1991 events in Asia